Texas A&M University–Corpus Christi (Texas A&M–Corpus Christi, TAMU-CC, A&M-Corpus Christi, or A&M-CC) is a public research university in Corpus Christi, Texas. It is part of the Texas A&M University System and classified among "R2: Doctoral Universities – High research activity".

History 

TAMU-CC originally opened in 1947 as the University of Corpus Christi, a private university operated by the Baptist General Convention of Texas (BGCT).

After the campus was severely damaged by Hurricane Celia in 1970, the school (which had financial problems since the outset) could not afford to rebuild and requested the Texas Legislature for assistance.  The Legislature approved opening a branch of the Texas A&M University System the following year; UCC held its final graduating class in 1973, and BGCT sold the campus to the state shortly thereafter, retaining 10 acres to maintain a student religious center.

Originally named Texas A&I University at Corpus Christi, it was later named Corpus Christi State University before joining the Texas A&M University System in 1989 and taking its current name.

Presidents

Academics 

Texas A&M-Corpus Christi offers 33 undergraduate majors, 25 graduate programs, and six doctoral programs through six colleges.

The College of Liberal Arts has seven departments, housing 12 undergraduate and six graduate degrees, ranging from the arts to criminal justice to psychology.

The College of Business offers eight undergraduate and two graduate degrees and is accredited by AACSB.

The College of Education and Human Development offers teacher certification in more than 30 areas as well as three undergraduate degrees, 11 graduate programs, and two doctoral programs.

The College of Science offers eight undergraduate and three graduate degrees.

The College of Engineering offers five undergraduate and two graduate degrees.

The College of Nursing and Health Sciences offers two undergraduate degrees and four graduate degrees, including the doctor of nursing practice.

The College of University Studies offers a degree in university studies.

The university also includes The School of Arts, Media, and Communication within the College of Liberal Arts.

Centers, institutes, and affiliates 

The Conrad Blucher Institute for Surveying and Science is a research institute dedicated to geospatial science. The Institute was founded by an endowment from the Conrad Blucher family. Research by the institute includes the Texas Coastal Ocean Observation Network (a tide monitoring system), Texas Spatial Reference Center research for the Texas Height Modernization, and other geospatial research relating to surveying and mapping.

The Harte Research Institute for Gulf of Mexico Studies brings scientists to the campus to strengthen TAMU-CC's research on environmental issues facing the Gulf of Mexico, area wetlands, coastal waterways, and beaches. Other centers on campus conduct research on biodiversity through offshore scientific diving expeditions, and aid in oil spill response, hurricane tracking, and commercial shipping.

The Lone Star UAS Center of Excellence & Innovation is one of the six unmanned aircraft system test sites in the USA, designated by the Federal Aviation Administration in 2014.

Student life

Student government 
The Student Government Association at TAMU-CC hosts the officers of the student body. The SGA runs a three-branch system, with the Executive Board consisting of the Student Body Officers, the Legislative Branch consisting of the Student Senate, and the Judicial Branch consisting of the Chief and Associate Justices.

The current legislative branch, or Student Senate, has two underlying groups of senators: general senators, which holds an international senator, a student veteran senator, a housing senator, an athletics senator, disability services senator, and a library senator. The college senators, which holds three senators for each of the seven colleges: Business, Education & Human Development, Liberal Arts, Nursing & Health Sciences, Science & Engineering, Graduate Studies, and University College.

Elections for SGA are held twice a year, once near the close of the spring for all positions and then at the opening of the fall for the freshman senators and remaining vacancies from the spring elections.

Publications 
TAMU-CC has an entirely student-run newspaper, Island Waves. It was first published in 1993, and is, in part, funded through student fees and advertisement sales. Issues are published every Thursday throughout the fall and spring semesters, with three issues printed over the summer.

Islander Magazine is a biannual news publication for Texas A&M University-Corpus Christi, first published in the Fall of 2006.

Greek life 
TAMU-CC is home to three Interfraternity Council Fraternities (IFC): Phi Gamma Delta, Sigma Phi Epsilon, and Sigma Pi. The university has four National Panhellenic Sororities (NPC). Alpha Gamma Delta, Delta Delta Delta, Gamma Phi Beta, and Zeta Tau Alpha. The university also has six Multicultural Greek Council organizations (MGC): Lambda Theta Alpha, Sigma Lambda Gamma, Alpha Kappa Alpha, Omega Delta Phi, Alpha Phi Alpha, and Kappa Delta Chi. Greek Life is a growing aspect of the TAMU-CC campus gaining notoriety and size over the years since it began at the university in 1998.

Islander Dining Hall 

Islander Dining Hall has been designated as an Ocean Friendly Restaurant (OFR). It is the second university dining hall in the nation to receive the designation. As part of 400 OFR in the U.S., Islander Dining Hall is working to lower an estimated 5.25 trillion pieces of plastic entering the world's marine ecosystems.  Elizabeth Alford, Marketing Manager for the Islander Dining Hall, said of the designation:"With the university surrounded by Oso Bay and Corpus Christi Bay, it is important that we take the initiative to reduce the amount of plastic and Styrofoam waste that could potentially come from Islander Dining Hall. . . . It is imperative that we use our location as an educational tool for our students. This recognition encourages our community to be stewards of the environment."Islander Dining Hall has banned the use of Styrofoam, plastic bags, plastic plates, and plastic utensils. Islander Dining Hall also uses reusable food ware for onsite dining, recycles and provides biodegradable coffee cups and to-go plates.

Athletics 

The Texas A&M–Corpus Christi (TAMUCC) athletic teams are called the Islanders. The university is a member of the Division I level of the National Collegiate Athletic Association (NCAA), primarily competing in the Southland Conference since the 2006–07 academic year. Prior to that, the Islanders had competed as an NCAA Division III Independent from 1999–2000 to 2001–02; as well as an NCAA D-I Independent from 2002–03 to 2005–06.

TAMUCC competes in 14 intercollegiate varsity sports: Men's sports include baseball, basketball, cross country, tennis, and track & field (indoor and outdoor); women's sports include basketball, beach volleyball, cross country, golf, soccer, softball, tennis, track, and field (indoor and outdoor) and volleyball.

Nickname/mascot 
TAMUCC's team nickname, the Islanders, was taken from the institution being located on an island. Their mascot is "Izzy the Islander", a blue figure designed to represent the "coastal lifestyle" of Corpus Christi. He was redesigned in 2022, previously depicting a costumed man with a tiki mask headdress, grass skirt, and spear. Prior to that, the official mascot was "Tarpie" the Tarpon.

Men's basketball 

The TAMUCC Islanders basketball team is coached by Steve Lutz and play their home games at the American Bank Center as well as at the Dugan Wellness Center on the University's campus. They have played in the NCAA tournament three times, most recently in 2023.

Women's cross country 
The TAMUCC Islander cross country team is regarded as the most successful sport in school history, as the women's team has won seven of the nine conference titles (more than any other team in the history of Texas universities). In 2009, they scored the highest at the regional meet, with a sixth-place finish. In 2018, under new head coach Brent Ericksen, the Islander women won the Southland Conference title by one point, making the win the smallest margin in conference history.

Facilities 
Notable buildings on campus:

 Bay Hall
 Corpus Christi Hall
 Dr. Robert R. Furgason Engineering Building
 Dugan Wellness Center/Island Hall
 Early Childhood Development Center
 Michael and Karen O'Connor Building
 Mary and Jeff Bell Library
 Performing Arts Center
 Tidal Hall
 University Center

Community engagement 
Texas A&M University-Corpus Christi operates the Coastal Bend Business Innovation Center as part of the College of Business. The center is a U.S. Economic Development Administration University Center. The center provides support for new ventures to resident (on-site) and non-resident clients.

The Art Museum of South Texas has been affiliated with the university since 1995. The museum traces its roots to the Centennial Museum founded in 1936 and now occupies an area on Corpus Christi Bay across the channel from the Texas State Aquarium. The Art Museum is one of several attractions that are part of the Sports, Entertainment, and Arts (SEA) district of Corpus Christi.

The university operates the Antonio E. Garcia Arts & Education Center. The center provides programming and classes for the community and particularly for k-12 students and those who are at-risk students.

Notable people

Alumni

 Justin Butts, writer and host of KEDT "Your Wholesome Heritage Garden" radio show 
 Chris Daniels, basketball player
 Robert Gammage, Texas politician
 Paulette Guajardo, politician, mayor of Corpus Christi
 Rose Meza Harrison, Texas politician
 Kim Henkel, screenplay writer, producer and actor
 Cassandra Jean, actress, model, and beauty pageant
 Kevin Palmer, basketball player
 Sarah Pauly, softball player
 Richard D. Sorenson, educational leadership author
 Raul Torres, Texas politician
 Larry D. Wyche,  United States Army Lieutenant General
 Rose Meza Harrison, Texas politician

Notable faculty 
 Anantha Babbili
 Elliot Chenaux
 Colleen Fitzgerald
 Gary Jeffress
 Robert S. Nelsen

Photo gallery

See also

 Hispanic-serving institution
 Harte Research Institute for Gulf of Mexico Studies
 List of colleges and universities in Texas
 Texas A&M–Corpus Christi Islanders
 Texas A&M University System

References

External links 
 
 Official athletics website

 
Public universities and colleges in Texas
Texas A&M University System
Universities and colleges accredited by the Southern Association of Colleges and Schools
Education in Corpus Christi, Texas
Educational institutions established in 1947
Buildings and structures in Corpus Christi, Texas
1947 establishments in Texas